Husøya is a small island and the administrative centre of Træna Municipality in Nordland county, Norway. The Træna Lighthouse lies south of the island. The island is only accessible by boat, and there is regular ferry service from Husøya to the island of Selvær and to Stokkvågen on the mainland.

Most of the flat island is made up of the village of Husøya, which is the administrative centre of the municipality. It is the location of Træna Church.

The annual Træna Music Festival is held here and on the neighboring island of Sanna.

Media gallery

References

Villages in Nordland
Islands of Nordland
Populated places of Arctic Norway
Træna